The New Orleans mayoral election of 1934 was held  on January 23, 1934.  It resulted in the re-election of T. Semmes Walmsley as Mayor of New Orleans.

Candidates 
The incumbent mayor, T. Semmes Walmsley, was backed by the Regular Democratic Organization, a powerful political machine which had dominated the city for decades, as well as by the wealthy residents of the city's Uptown neighborhood.    Francis Williams, a longtime enemy of Senator Huey Long, was backed by an independent political organization led by himself and his brother.  Long, looking to break the hold of the Old Regulars over New Orleans, searched for his own candidate, but potential nominees Paul H. Maloney and Joe O'Hara were reluctant to face the Old Regulars.   Long eventually convinced John Klorer, Sr., a respected engineer and father of the editor of Long's American Progress newspaper, to head the Long ticket.

Campaign 
The campaign was a vigorous one, with a level of vitriol and excitement uncommon even by New Orleans standards.  Walmsley emphasized his close ties with popular President Franklin Delano Roosevelt, and portrayed the campaign as a referendum on Huey Long.   Klorer, a quiet unassuming man, kept a low profile while Huey Long did most of the public speaking for the Klorer campaign.  Huey gave daily radio broadcasts interspersing tirades against the mayor he called "Turkey Head" Walmsley with amusing songs.  Both Williams and Long accused the Old Regulars of tolerating vice and embezzling municipal funds.    Walmsley responded to Huey's insults by threatening to "choke those words down his cowardly throat next time we meet."

In the final days of the campaign, Long supporters were caught removing names of Old Regular supporters from the voter rolls, so the registration books were seized  by the civil sheriff and placed in the Orleans Parish Prison for safekeeping.   Long's ally Governor Oscar K. Allen ordered the Louisiana National Guard to mobilize for New Orleans to defend the registrar's office, while Walmsley threatened to deputize ten thousand "special police."  With potential armed clashes between the National Guard and Walmsley's police looming, a last minute agreement to submit to an arbitration committee averted a crisis.

Results 
Walmsley won reelection with 47,753 votes (44%), followed by Klorer with 32,066 (30%) and Williams with 28,085 (26%).   Walmsley and Klorer faced a runoff election, but with Williams adamantly refusing to endorse a Long candidate, Klorer withdrew from the race.  The results were seen across the state and nation as a defeat for Long.

Sources 
 Boulard, Garry.  Huey Long Invades New Orleans:  The Siege of a City, 1934-36.  Pelican, 1998.
 Hair, William Ivy.  The Kingfish and his Realm:  The Life and Times of Huey P. Long.  LSU Press, 1991.
 Parker, Joseph B.  The Morrison Era: Reform Politics in New Orleans.  Pelican, 1974. 
 Williams, T. Harry.  Huey Long.  Knopf, 1969.

1934
1934 Louisiana elections
New Orleans